American singer Miley Cyrus has released eight studio albums, three live albums, four extended plays and 37 singles. Popularly referred as the original "Teen Queen", Cyrus has sold 55 million singles and 20 million albums worldwide. According to Recording Industry Association of America, she has sold 32 million singles and 10 million albums in the US. Billboard ranked Cyrus as the ninth greatest Billboard 200 female artist of all time and the 62nd greatest artist of all time. 

In June 2007, the series' second soundtrack and Cyrus' debut studio album were jointly released by Walt Disney Records and Hollywood Records as the double album Hannah Montana 2: Meet Miley Cyrus. The project reached number one in the United States. Its latter disc included the single "See You Again", which became Cyrus' first track to impact the top-ten in the United States, Australia, and Canada. On her debut live album Best of Both Worlds Concert, released in March 2008, Cyrus performed seven songs as herself and seven tracks as her title character Hannah Montana.

The singer's second studio album Breakout was released in July 2008, topping the United States, Australian, and Canadian charts. Its lead single "7 Things" reached the top 10 in the United States, Australia, and Norway. Cyrus' first extended play The Time of Our Lives followed in August 2009, and its track "Party in the U.S.A." made the top five in the United States, Canada, Ireland, and New Zealand. In that same year she released a live album tittled iTunes Live from london. She released her third studio album Can't Be Tamed in June 2010, peaking within the top five in the United States, Australia, Austria, Canada, Germany, Ireland, Italy, and New Zealand. While the title track reached the top 10 in the United States, Canada, Ireland, and New Zealand, the album was less commercially successful than her past efforts.

Cyrus' fourth studio album Bangerz was released through RCA Records in October 2013, topping the United States, Australia, Canada, Ireland, Norway, and the United Kingdom charts. Its songs "We Can't Stop" and "Wrecking Ball" both reached the summit in the United Kingdom while former also topped the charts in New Zealand and the latter went number one in the United States and Canada. Her fifth album, Miley Cyrus & Her Dead Petz, was released via streaming in August 2015 and did not chart. She released her sixth album Younger Now in September 2017, which charted within the top five in the United States, Australia, Canada, Ireland, and New Zealand. Its lead single "Malibu" reached the top five in Australia, Canada, Norway, and New Zealand. In 2019, Cyrus released her fourth EP titled She Is Coming. In 2020, Cyrus released her seventh studio album Plastic Hearts.

Albums

Studio albums

Live albums

Karaoke albums

Extended plays

Singles

As lead artist

As featured artist

Promotional singles

Charity singles

Other charted songs

Notes

References

General

Specific

External links
 
 Miley Cyrus at MTV

Discographies of American artists
Discography
Pop music discographies